Phaegoptera schaefferi is a moth of the family Erebidae. It was described by William Schaus in 1892. It is found in Venezuela and Brazil.

References

Phaegoptera
Moths described in 1892